Diucifon is a leprostatic agent.

References

Sulfonamides
Benzosulfones
Pyrimidinediones
Antileprotic drugs
Russian drugs